Adolf Furrer (born Johann Adolf Furrer-Kägi, 13 November 1873 – 15 January 1958) was a Swiss military officer and small arms designer. He used to be the director of the Waffenfabrik Bern and held the rank of Oberstbrigadier (Chief Brigadier) in the Swiss Army.

Adolf Furrer was involved with numerous firearms designs in the Swiss Army's arsenal in the first half of 20th century. He is most well known for the Furrer MP41/44 submachine gun that Swiss Army adopted during World War II, thanks to passionate lobbying of Swiss Army officials. The Furrer MP41/44 would become regarded as one of the worst firearm designs of World War II and history.

Background
Johann Adolf Furrer-Kägi was born on 13 November 1873 in Zürich, Switzerland. At unknown time - before 1921 - he had enlisted into Swiss Army. He rose from an officer to a rank of Colonel while in service. Around 1921, Colonel Furrer was appointed as head of the Waffenfabrik Bern, state small arms factory. He would remain director of the factory up until 1940.

In 1933, the Furrer Automatic Cannon was introduced to Swiss Air Force service.

In 1941, at early stages of World War II, a review of Swiss army revealed a lack of submachine guns, with less than 500 pieces in army stocks. The Swiss army commissioned SIG and W+F Bern, then the two of the largest domestic small arms produces in Switzerland, to create new submachine gun prototypes for the Army. Adolf Furrer designed the Lmg-Pist 41/44 (aka Furrer MP41/44) to be produced by Waffenfabrik Bern, while SIG had developed the MP-41 Neuhausen Submachine Gun. The Swiss Army was to hold tests to determine which submachine gun design would be adopted.

However, Furrer was politically connected to Swiss Army and tried passionately to persuade the military to choose Furrer's own submachine gun design. Ultimately, the submachine gun trials were derailed with no chance for SIG to present their MP-41's capabilities properly and Swiss Army would adopt MP41/44.

Ultimately, the Furrer MP41/44 was plagued with production problems and reliability issues that caused a great amount of trouble for the Swiss Army and damage Adolf Furrer's reputation.

After World War II, Furrer retired from military service and weapons design. Furrer died in 1958 in Minusio, Switzerland at aged 84.

Weapons design

Many of Furrer's designs incorporated the toggle-lock mechanism popularized by the Luger P08 and would utilize them in his designs well into 1930s and 1940s, when the toggle-lock system was considered outdated design.

Early part of his firearms design career, Furrer mainly worked with Luger P08 and Maxim guns, which may have influenced his liking for the system. He experimented with stock Luger firing mechanisms and his work would spawn the Furrer 1919 SMG prototype.

Designed weaponry
Adolf Furrer has designed/or contributed to designs of following firearms.
 Furrer Fliegerpistole
 Furrer MP19
 Flieger-Doppelpistole
 Swiss M1921 Automatic Carbine 
 Leichtes Maschinengewehr Modell 1925
 Karabiner Model 1931 (K31)
 Furrer MP41/44
 24mm Tankbüchse 41

Notes
1.This was before 2004, before Military of Switzerland adopted new rank system.
2. Because of Furrer's politicking and pushing for his own error-prone submachine gun over the SIG's potentially better design.
3.Firearms using toggle lock systems were distinctly late 1800s and early 1900s design. By 1930s and 1940s, simpler designs for firing mechanisms had been invented and made firearms production easier. Although firearms using toggle-lock had service life to used even past World War II (such as Luger P08 and Vickers Machine Gun), there were essentially no new toggle lock firearms made around 1930s and 1940s with exception to Furrer's own designs.

References

 Verein Schweizer Armeemuseum, Bulletin Nr. 1 2014: Der Waffenentwickler Adolf Furrer und seine Tätigkeit
 
 US Patent 1 518 498
 Forgotten Weapons entry of Furrer 1919 Smg
 Forgotten Weapons entry of MP41/44 SMG
 Weaponnews Tank Gun
 Weaponnews article on MP41/44 SMG

Switzerland in World War II
Firearm designers
Swiss military officers
1873 births
1958 deaths